Kapella may refer to:

 Kapella River, in Canada
 , a ship

See also 
 Kappela, a 2020 film
 Kapela (disambiguation)
 Kapelle (disambiguation)
 Capella (disambiguation)